The Paradise Again World Tour was the fourth concert tour by Swedish supergroup Swedish House Mafia, in support of their 2022 album, Paradise Again. The tour originally had 44 dates, some of which were cancelled, though the band also added three dates (Los Angeles & a second San Francisco show) to the tour, and moved a show from MetLife Stadium to Madison Square Garden, as well as adding a 2nd date at MSG, one of which was cancelled.

Buildup
Before the tour began, the album was released in April 2022, this was followed by sets at Coachella alongside The Weeknd, after a last minute lineup change. They were originally scheduled to close the Friday night. During Coachella they also played an exclusive Spotify set, this was invite only and done as a release party. There where no other public shows between April 2022 and a set in July 2022 shortly before the tour began, this took place in Ibiza.

Setlist
This set list is representative of the show in Miami on July 29, 2022. It is not intended to represent all concerts for the tour.

 "Can U Feel It"
 "It Gets Better (Stockholm Version)" / "Greyhound" / "Can U Feel It"
 "Miami 2 Ibiza (Swedish House Mafia 2022 Rework)" / "Can U Feel It"
 "Sacrifice (Remix)"
 "19.30" / "We Come, We Rave, We Love"
 "Calling On" / "Laktos"
 "Lifetime (Swedish House Mafia 2022 Rework)" / "Be" / "Show Me Love" / Knas"
 "Calling" / "Tell Me Why"
 "Frankenstein" / "More Than You Know" / "Teasing Mr. Charlie"
 "Antidote (Swedish House Mafia 2022 Rework)"
 "Redlight"
 "Dream Bigger"
 "One (Your Name)"
 "Don't Go Mad"
 "For Sale (Swedish House Mafia Remode)" / "Jack U"
 "Rave n' Roll (Corey James Remix)"
 "Time" / "Reload"
 "Leave The World Behind (Swedish House Mafia 2022 Rework)"
 "Love Inc" / "In My Mind (Axwell Mix)" / "Phunk (Swedish House Mafia 2022 Rework)"
 "Suffocate" / "Turn On The Lights Again.."
 "Moth to a Flame (Remix)"
 "Heaven Takes You Home" / "Graveyard (Axwell Remix)" / "Sweet Disposition (Axwell & Dirty South Remix)"
 "Don't You Worry Child" / "For You" / "Save The World"

Additional notes
 Starting on August 26 with the show in Dallas, Swedish House Mafia performed "Knas" alongside "Sacrifice (Remix)".
 Starting on September 2 with the show in Las Vegas, an unreleased song called "Dreams" was added to the set list . "Moth to a Flame" also started being played in its original form, and "Phunk" was removed from the set list.
 Starting on September 9 with the show in Los Angeles, "Laktos" was removed from the setlist and was replaced with "Kidsos".
 On the September 17 show in San Francisco, Swedish House Mafia played a collaboration with Alicia Keys titled "Finally" after "Turn On The Lights again..".
 On the October 2 show in London, Swedish House Mafia was joined by Tinie Tempah to perform "Miami 2 Ibiza" and Connie Constance to perform "Heaven Takes You Home". "Heart Is King" was also added to the set list alongside "Sacrifice (Remix)" and "Knas", and "Suffocate" was removed from the set list.

Tour dates

Notes

Cancelled shows

Controversies

Cancellations and ticket sale rumors
A few days before the tour began, multiple US dates were cancelled, specifically, Orlando, a second date at MSG, Boston, Washington DC, New Jersey, Saint Paul, Phoenix and Detroit. A lot of speculation about low ticket sales was given as the reason, however, this was later debunked by the fact that both the opening shows sold out.  The cancellations were reportedly due to the economic situation and inflation - beyond the group's control.

References

2022 concert tours
Concert tours of North America
Concert tours of the United States
Concert tours of Canada
Concert tours of Europe
Concert tours of the United Kingdom
Concert tours of France
Concert tours of Germany
Concert tours of Italy
Concert tours of Spain
Concert tours of Portugal
Concert tours of Denmark
Concert tours of Norway